Waveform Audio File Format (WAVE, or WAV due to its filename extension; pronounced "wave") is an audio file format standard, developed by IBM and Microsoft, for storing an audio bitstream on PCs. It is the main format used on Microsoft Windows systems for uncompressed audio. The usual bitstream encoding is the linear pulse-code modulation (LPCM) format.

WAV is an application of the Resource Interchange File Format (RIFF) bitstream format method for storing data in chunks, and thus is similar to the 8SVX and the AIFF format used on Amiga and Macintosh computers, respectively.

Description 
The WAV file is an instance of a Resource Interchange File Format (RIFF) defined by IBM and Microsoft. The RIFF format acts as a "wrapper" for various audio coding formats.

Though a WAV file can contain compressed audio, the most common WAV audio format is uncompressed audio in the linear pulse-code modulation (LPCM) format. LPCM is also the standard audio coding format for audio CDs, which store two-channel LPCM audio sampled at 44.1 kHz with 16 bits per sample. Since LPCM is uncompressed and retains all of the samples of an audio track, professional users or audio experts may use the WAV format with LPCM audio for maximum audio quality. WAV files can also be edited and manipulated with relative ease using software.

The WAV format supports compressed audio using, on Microsoft Windows, the Audio Compression Manager (ACM). Any ACM codec can be used to compress a WAV file. The user interface (UI) for Audio Compression Manager may be accessed through various programs that use it, including Sound Recorder in some versions of Windows.

Beginning with Windows 2000, a WAVE_FORMAT_EXTENSIBLE header was defined which specifies multiple audio channel data along with speaker positions, eliminates ambiguity regarding sample types and container sizes in the standard WAV format and supports defining custom extensions to the format chunk.

There are some inconsistencies in the WAV format: for example, 8-bit data is unsigned while 16-bit data is signed, and many chunks duplicate information found in other chunks.

Specification

RIFF
A RIFF file is a tagged file format. It has a specific container format (a chunk) that includes a four-character tag (FourCC) and the size (number of bytes) of the chunk. The tag specifies how the data within the chunk should be interpreted, and there are several standard FourCC tags. Tags consisting of all capital letters are reserved tags. The outermost chunk of a RIFF file has a RIFF form tag; the first four bytes of chunk data are a FourCC that specify the form type and are followed by a sequence of subchunks. In the case of a WAV file, those four bytes are the FourCC WAVE. The remainder of the RIFF data is a sequence of chunks describing the audio information.

The advantage of a tagged file format is that the format can be extended later without confusing existing file readers. The rule for a RIFF (or WAV) reader is that it should ignore any tagged chunk that it does not recognize. The reader won't be able to use the new information, but the reader should not be confused.

The specification for RIFF files includes the definition of an INFO chunk. The chunk may include information such as the title of the work, the author, the creation date, and copyright information. Although the INFO chunk was defined in version 1.0, the chunk was not referenced in the formal specification of a WAV file. If the chunk were present in the file, then a reader should know how to interpret it, but many readers had trouble. Some readers would abort when they encountered the chunk, some readers would process the chunk if it were the first chunk in the RIFF form, and other readers would process it if it followed all of the expected waveform data. Consequently, the safest thing to do from an interchange standpoint was to omit the INFO chunk and other extensions and send a lowest-common-denominator file. There are other INFO chunk placement problems.

RIFF files were expected to be used in international environments, so there is CSET chunk to specify the country code, language, dialect, and code page for the strings in a RIFF file. For example, specifying an appropriate CSET chunk should allow the strings in an INFO chunk (and other chunks throughout the RIFF file) to be interpreted as Cyrillic or Japanese characters.

RIFF also defines a JUNK chunk whose contents are uninteresting.  The chunk allows a chunk to be deleted by just changing its FourCC. The chunk could also be used to reserve some space for future edits so the file could be modified without being rewritten. A later definition of RIFF introduced a similar PAD  chunk.

RIFF WAVE
The toplevel definition of a WAV file is:
<WAVE-form> → RIFF('WAVE'
                   <fmt-ck>            // Format of the file
                   [<fact-ck>]         // Fact chunk
                   [<cue-ck>]          // Cue points
                   [<playlist-ck>]     // Playlist
                   [<assoc-data-list>] // Associated data list
                   <wave-data> )       // Wave data
The definition shows a toplevel RIFF form with the WAVE tag. It is followed by a mandatory <fmt-ck> format chunk that describes the format of the sample data that follows. The format chunk includes information such as the sample encoding, number of bits per channel, the number of channels, the sample rate. The WAV specification includes some optional features. The optional fact chunk reports the number of samples for some compressed coding schemes. The cue point (cue ) chunk identifies some significant sample numbers in the wave file. The playlist chunk allows the samples to be played out of order or repeated rather than just from beginning to end.  The associated data list allows labels and notes (labl and note) to be attached to cue points; text annotation (ltxt) may be given for a group of samples (e.g., caption information).  Finally, the mandatory wave data chunk contains the actual samples (in the specified format).

Note that the WAV file definition does not show where an INFO chunk should be placed. It is also silent about the placement of a CSET chunk (which specifies the character set used).

The RIFF specification attempts to be a formal specification, but its formalism lacks the precision seen in other tagged formats. For example, the RIFF specification does not clearly distinguish between a set of subchunks and an ordered sequence of subchunks. The RIFF form chunk suggests it should be a sequence container. The specification suggests a LIST chunk is also a sequence: "A LIST chunk contains a list, or ordered sequence, of subchunks." However, the specification does not give a formal specification of the INFO chunk; an example INFO LIST chunk ignores the chunk sequence implied in the INFO description. The LIST chunk definition for <wave-data> does use the LIST chunk as a sequence container with good formal semantics.

The WAV specification allows for not only a single, contiguous, array of audio samples, but also discrete blocks of samples and silence that are played in order. Most WAV files use a single array of data. The specification for the sample data is confused:
The <wave-data> contains the waveform data. It is defined as follows:
  <wave-data>  → { <data-ck> | <data-list> }
  <data-ck>    → data( <wave-data> )
  <wave-list>  → LIST( 'wavl' { <data-ck> | // Wave samples
                                <silence-ck> }... ) // Silence
  <silence-ck> → slnt( <dwSamples:DWORD> ) // Count of silent samplesThese productions are confused. Apparently <data-list> (undefined) and <wave-list> (defined but not referenced) should be identical. Even if that problem is fixed, the productions then allow a <data-ck> to contain a recursive <wave-data> (which implies data interpretation problems). The specification should have been something like:
<wave-data>  → { <data-ck> | <wave-list> }
  <data-ck>    → data( <bSampleData:BYTE> ... )
  <wave-list>  → LIST( 'wavl' { <data-ck> | // Wave samples
                                <silence-ck> }... ) // Silence
  <silence-ck> → slnt( <dwSamples:DWORD> ) // Count of silent samplesto avoid the recursion.

WAV files can contain embedded IFF "lists", which can contain several "sub-chunks".

Metadata
As a derivative of RIFF, WAV files can be tagged with metadata in the INFO chunk. In addition, WAV files can embed any kind of metadata, including but not limited to Extensible Metadata Platform (XMP) data or ID3 tags in extra chunks. Applications may not handle this extra information or may expect to see it in a particular place. Although the RIFF specification requires that applications ignore chunks they do not recognize, some applications are confused by additional chunks.

Popularity 
Uncompressed WAV files are large, so file sharing of WAV files over the Internet is uncommon except among video, music and audio professionals where the uncompressed form has become the most popular of all audio formats and, for most, high speed large bandwidth web connections are commonplace. Many audio and music software manufacturers now favour it as their default file format though others are often supported. The high resolution of the format makes it suitable for retaining first generation archived files of high quality, for use on a system where disk space is not a constraint, or in applications such as audio editing where the time involved in compressing and uncompressing data, and the losses in quality of such conversions are a concern.

Use by broadcasters
In spite of their large size, uncompressed WAV files are used by most radio broadcasters, especially those that have adopted a tapeless system.

 BBC Radio in the UK uses 48 kHz 16-bit two-channel WAV audio as standard in their SCISYS dira audio editing and playout system.
 The UK Commercial radio company Global Radio uses 44.1 kHz 16-bit two-channel WAV files in the Genesys playout system, and throughout their broadcast chain.
 The ABC "D-Cart" system, which was developed by the Australian broadcaster, uses 48 kHz 16-bit two-channel WAV files, which is identical to that of Digital Audio Tape.
 The Digital Radio Mondiale consortium uses WAV files as an informal standard for transmitter simulation and receiver testing.

Limitations 
The WAV format is limited to files that are less than 4 GiB, because of its use of a 32-bit unsigned integer to record the file size header. Although this is equivalent to about 6.8 hours of CD-quality audio (44.1 kHz, 16-bit stereo), it is sometimes necessary to exceed this limit, especially when greater sampling rates, bit resolutions or channel count are required. The W64 format was therefore created for use in Sound Forge. Its 64-bit header allows for much longer recording times. The RF64 format specified by the European Broadcasting Union has also been created to solve this problem.

Non-audio data 
Since the sampling rate of a WAV file can vary from 1 Hz to 4.3 GHz, and the number of channels can be as high as 65535, .wav files have also been used for non-audio data.  LTspice, for instance, can store multiple circuit trace waveforms in separate channels, at any appropriate sampling rate, with the full-scale range representing ±1 V or A rather than a sound pressure.

Audio compact discs 
Audio compact discs (CDs) do not use the WAV file format, using instead Red Book audio. The commonality is that audio CDs are encoded as uncompressed pulse-code modulation (PCM), which is one of the formats supported by WAV. WAV is a file format for a computer to use that cannot be understood by most CD players directly. To record WAV files to an Audio CD the file headers must be stripped, the contents must be transcoded if not already stored as PCM, and the PCM data written directly to the disc as individual tracks with zero-padding added to match the CD's sector size.

In order for PCM audio to be able to be burned to a CD, it should be in the 44.1 kHz, 16-bit stereo format.

Comparison of coding schemes

Audio in WAV files can be encoded in a variety of audio coding formats, such as GSM or MP3, to reduce the file size.

This is a reference to compare the monophonic (not stereophonic) audio quality and compression bitrates of audio coding formats available for WAV files including PCM, ADPCM, Microsoft GSM 06.10, CELP, SBC, Truespeech and MPEG Layer-3. These are the default ACM codecs that come with Windows.

The above are WAV files; even those that use MP3 compression have the .wav extension.

See also 
 Audio Compression Manager
 Broadcast Wave Format (BWF)
 Comparison of audio coding formats
 RF64, an extended file format for audio (multichannel file format enabling file sizes to exceed 4 gigabytes)
 Windows Media Audio

References

External links

 WAVE file format specifications - from McGill University, (Last update: 2011-01-03)
 Extensible Wave-Format Descriptors from Microsoft (Updated October 26, 2017)
 More information on WAVE_FORMAT_EXTENSIBLE - University of Bath
 WAVE File Format - technical details (1999)
 WAV & BWF Metadata Guide
 Exif tags; see, for example, page 128

Audio file formats
Digital container formats
Computer-related introductions in 1991
Microsoft Windows multimedia technology